Leptolalax tengchongensis is a species of frog in the family Megophryidae from the Gaoligong Mountains of Tengchong County, Yunnan, China. It is sympatric with Leptobrachium tengchongense.

References

tengchongensis
Amphibians of China
Frogs of Asia
Amphibians described in 2016